Miltochrista delicata is a moth of the family Erebidae first described by Frederic Moore in 1878. It is found in Sikkim, India.

References

delicata
Moths described in 1878
Moths of Asia